Philip Mackenzie Ross (1890–1974) was a Scottish golf course architect who worked throughout Europe developing golf courses in France, Spain and Portugal as well as the United Kingdom. After 1945 he carried out a great deal of remodelling and restoration and in 1949 completed Southerness, in southwest Scotland, which is probably his most respected work. In 1971 Ross was elected the first president of the British Association of Golf Course Architects.

Famous for designing the Ailsa Course at Turnberry (1946) in Ayr, Scotland

External links
EIGCA | Articles | Golf Course Architecture in Europe – 100 Years of Evolution at www.eigca.org
North Berwick Golfing Pioneers

Golf course architects
1890 births
1947 deaths